In their most common sense, the terms thought and thinking refer to conscious cognitive processes that can happen independently of sensory stimulation. Their most paradigmatic forms are judging, reasoning, concept formation, problem solving, and deliberation. But other mental processes, like considering an idea, memory, or imagination, are also often included. These processes can happen internally independent of the sensory organs, unlike perception. But when understood in the widest sense, any mental event may be understood as a form of thinking, including perception and unconscious mental processes. In a slightly different sense, the term thought refers not to the mental processes themselves but to mental states or systems of ideas brought about by these processes.

Various theories of thinking have been proposed, some of which aim to capture the characteristic features of thought. Platonists hold that thinking consists in discerning and inspecting Platonic forms and their interrelations. It involves the ability to discriminate between the pure Platonic forms themselves and the mere imitations found in the sensory world. According to Aristotelianism, to think about something is to instantiate in one's mind the universal essence of the object of thought. These universals are abstracted from sense experience and are not understood as existing in a changeless intelligible world, in contrast to Platonism. Conceptualism is closely related to Aristotelianism: it identifies thinking with mentally evoking concepts instead of instantiating essences. Inner speech theories claim that thinking is a form of inner speech in which words are silently expressed in the thinker's mind. According to some accounts, this happens in a regular language, like English or French. The language of thought hypothesis, on the other hand, holds that this happens in the medium of a unique mental language called Mentalese. Central to this idea is that linguistic representational systems are built up from atomic and compound representations and that this structure is also found in thought. Associationists understand thinking as the succession of ideas or images. They are particularly interested in the laws of association that govern how the train of thought unfolds. Behaviorists, by contrast, identify thinking with behavioral dispositions to engage in public intelligent behavior as a reaction to particular external stimuli. Computationalism is the most recent of these theories. It sees thinking in analogy to how computers work in terms of the storage, transmission, and processing of information.

Various types of thinking are discussed in the academic literature. A judgment is a mental operation in which a proposition is evoked and then either affirmed or denied. Reasoning, on the other hand, is the process of drawing conclusions from premises or evidence. Both judging and reasoning depend on the possession of the relevant concepts, which are acquired in the process of concept formation. In the case of problem solving, thinking aims at reaching a predefined goal by overcoming certain obstacles. Deliberation is an important form of practical thought that consists in formulating possible courses of action and assessing the reasons for and against them. This may lead to a decision by choosing the most favorable option. Both episodic memory and imagination present objects and situations internally, in an attempt to accurately reproduce what was previously experienced or as a free rearrangement, respectively. Unconscious thought is thought that happens without being directly experienced. It is sometimes posited to explain how difficult problems are solved in cases where no conscious thought was employed.

Thought is discussed in various academic disciplines. Phenomenology is interested in the experience of thinking. An important question in this field concerns the experiential character of thinking and to what extent this character can be explained in terms of sensory experience. Metaphysics is, among other things, interested in the relation between mind and matter. This concerns the question of how thinking can fit into the material world as described by the natural sciences. Cognitive psychology aims to understand thought as a form of information processing. Developmental psychology, on the other hand, investigates the development of thought from birth to maturity and asks which factors this development depends on. Psychoanalysis emphasizes the role of the unconscious in mental life. Other fields concerned with thought include linguistics, neuroscience, artificial intelligence, biology, and sociology. Various concepts and theories are closely related to the topic of thought. The term "law of thought" refers to three fundamental laws of logic: the law of contradiction, the law of excluded middle, and the principle of identity. Counterfactual thinking involves mental representations of non-actual situations and events in which the thinker tries to assess what would be the case if things had been different. Thought experiments often employ counterfactual thinking in order to illustrate theories or to test their plausibility. Critical thinking is a form of thinking that is reasonable, reflective, and focused on determining what to believe or how to act. Positive thinking involves focusing one's attention on the positive aspects of one's situation and is intimately related to optimism.

Definition
The terms "thought" and "thinking" refer to a wide variety of psychological activities. In their most common sense, they are understood as conscious processes that can happen independently of sensory stimulation. This includes various different mental processes, like considering an idea or proposition or judging it to be true. In this sense, memory and imagination are forms of thought but perception is not. In a more restricted sense, only the most paradigmatic cases are considered thought. These involve conscious processes that are conceptual or linguistic and sufficiently abstract, like judging, inferring, problem solving, and deliberating. Sometimes the terms "thought" and "thinking" are understood in a very wide sense as referring to any form of mental process, conscious or unconscious. In this sense, they may be used synonymously with the term "mind". This usage is encountered, for example, in the Cartesian tradition, where minds are understood as thinking things, and in the cognitive sciences. But this sense may include the restriction that such processes have to lead to intelligent behavior to be considered thought. A contrast sometimes found in the academic literature is that between thinking and feeling. In this context, thinking is associated with a sober, dispassionate, and rational approach to its topic while feeling involves a direct emotional engagement.

The terms "thought" and "thinking" can also be used to refer not to the mental processes themselves but to mental states or systems of ideas brought about by these processes. In this sense, they are often synonymous with the term "belief" and its cognates and may refer to the mental states which either belong to an individual or are common among a certain group of people. Discussions of thought in the academic literature often leave it implicit which sense of the term they have in mind.

The word thought comes from Old English þoht, or geþoht, from the stem of þencan "to conceive of in the mind, consider".

Theories of thinking
Various theories of thinking have been proposed. They aim to capture the characteristic features of thinking. The theories listed here are not exclusive: it may be possible to combine some without leading to a contradiction.

Platonism
According to Platonism, thinking is a spiritual activity in which Platonic forms and their interrelations are discerned and inspected. This activity is understood as a form of silent inner speech in which the soul talks to itself. Platonic forms are seen as universals that exist in a changeless realm different from the sensible world. Examples include the forms of goodness, beauty, unity, and sameness. On this view, the difficulty of thinking consists in being unable to grasp the Platonic forms and to distinguish them as the original from the mere imitations found in the sensory world. This means, for example, distinguishing beauty itself from derivative images of beauty. One problem for this view is to explain how humans can learn and think about Platonic forms belonging to a different realm. Plato himself tries to solve this problem through his theory of recollection, according to which the soul already was in contact with the Platonic forms before and is therefore able to remember what they are like. But this explanation depends on various assumptions usually not accepted in contemporary thought.

Aristotelianism and conceptualism
Aristotelians hold that the mind is able to think about something by instantiating the essence of the object of thought. So while thinking about trees, the mind instantiates tree-ness. This instantiation does not happen in matter, as is the case for actual trees, but in mind, though the universal essence instantiated in both cases is the same. In contrast to Platonism, these universals are not understood as Platonic forms existing in a changeless intelligible world. Instead, they only exist to the extent that they are instantiated. The mind learns to discriminate universals through abstraction from experience. This explanation avoids various of the objections raised against Platonism.

Conceptualism is closely related to Aristotelianism. It holds that thinking consists in mentally evoking concepts. Some of these concepts may be innate, but most have to be learned through abstraction from sense experience before they can be used in thought.

It has been argued against these views that they have problems in accounting for the logical form of thought. For example, to think that it will either rain or snow, it is not sufficient to instantiate the essences of rain and snow or to evoke the corresponding concepts. The reason for this is that the disjunctive relation between the rain and the snow is not captured this way. Another problem shared by these positions is the difficulty of giving a satisfying account of how essences or concepts are learned by the mind through abstraction.

Inner speech theory
Inner speech theories claim that thinking is a form of inner speech. This view is sometimes termed psychological nominalism. It states that thinking involves silently evoking words and connecting them to form mental sentences. The knowledge a person has of their thoughts can be explained as a form of overhearing one's own silent monologue. Three central aspects are often ascribed to inner speech: it is in an important sense similar to hearing sounds, it involves the use of language and it constitutes a motor plan that could be used for actual speech. This connection to language is supported by the fact that thinking is often accompanied by muscle activity in the speech organs. This activity may facilitate thinking in certain cases but is not necessary for it in general. According to some accounts, thinking happens not in a regular language, like English or French, but has its own type of language with the corresponding symbols and syntax. This theory is known as the language of thought hypothesis.

Inner speech theory has a strong initial plausibility since introspection suggests that indeed many thoughts are accompanied by inner speech. But its opponents usually contend that this is not true for all types of thinking. It has been argued, for example, that forms of daydreaming constitute non-linguistic thought. This issue is relevant to the question of whether animals have the capacity to think. If thinking is necessarily tied to language then this would suggest that there is an important gap between humans and animals since only humans have a sufficiently complex language. But the existence of non-linguistic thoughts suggests that this gap may not be that big and that some animals do indeed think.

Language of thought hypothesis
There are various theories about the relation between language and thought. One prominent version in contemporary philosophy is called the language of thought hypothesis. It states that thinking happens in the medium of a mental language. This language, often referred to as Mentalese, is similar to regular languages in various respects: it is composed of words that are connected to each other in syntactic ways to form sentences. This claim does not merely rest on an intuitive analogy between language and thought. Instead, it provides a clear definition of the features a representational system has to embody in order to have a linguistic structure. On the level of syntax, the representational system has to possess two types of representations: atomic and compound representations. Atomic representations are basic whereas compound representations are constituted either by other compound representations or by atomic representations. On the level of semantics, the semantic content or the meaning of the compound representations should depend on the semantic contents of its constituents. A representational system is linguistically structured if it fulfills these two requirements.

The language of thought hypothesis states that the same is true for thinking in general. This would mean that thought is composed of certain atomic representational constituents that can be combined as described above. Apart from this abstract characterization, no further concrete claims are made about how human thought is implemented by the brain or which other similarities to natural language it has. The language of thought hypothesis was first introduced by Jerry Fodor. He argues in favor of this claim by holding that it constitutes the best explanation of the characteristic features of thinking. One of these features is productivity: a system of representations is productive if it can generate an infinite number of unique representations based on a low number of atomic representations. This applies to thought since human beings are capable of entertaining an infinite number of distinct thoughts even though their mental capacities are quite limited. Other characteristic features of thinking include systematicity and inferential coherence. Fodor argues that the language of thought hypothesis is true because it explains how thought can have these features and because there is no good alternative explanation. Some arguments against the language of thought hypothesis are based on neural networks, which are able to produce intelligent behavior without depending on representational systems. Other objections focus on the idea that some mental representations happen non-linguistically, for example, in the form of maps or images.

Computationalists have been especially interested in the language of thought hypothesis since it provides ways to close the gap between thought in the human brain and computational processes implemented by computers. The reason for this is that processes over representations that respect syntax and semantics, like inferences according to the modus ponens, can be implemented by physical systems using causal relations. The same linguistic systems may be implemented through different material systems, like brains or computers. In this way, computers can think.

Associationism
An important view in the empiricist tradition has been associationism, the view that thinking consists in the succession of ideas or images. This succession is seen as being governed by laws of association, which determine how the train of thought unfolds. These laws are different from logical relations between the contents of thoughts, which are found in the case of drawing inferences by moving from the thought of the premises to the thought of the conclusion. Various laws of association have been suggested. According to the laws of similarity and contrast, ideas tend to evoke other ideas that are either very similar to them or their opposite. The law of contiguity, on the other hand, states that if two ideas were frequently experienced together, then the experience of one tends to cause the experience of the other. In this sense, the history of an organism's experience determines which thoughts the organism has and how these thoughts unfold. But such an association does not guarantee that the connection is meaningful or rational. For example, because of the association between the terms "cold" and "Idaho", the thought "this coffee shop is cold" might lead to the thought "Russia should annex Idaho".

One form of associationism is imagism. It states that thinking involves entertaining a sequence of images where earlier images conjure up later images based on the laws of association. One problem with this view is that we can think about things that we cannot imagine. This is especially relevant when the thought involves very complex objects or infinities, which is common, for example, in mathematical thought. One criticism directed at associationism in general is that its claim is too far-reaching. There is wide agreement that associative processes as studied by associationists play some role in how thought unfolds. But the claim that this mechanism is sufficient to understand all thought or all mental processes is usually not accepted.

Behaviorism
According to behaviorism, thinking consists in behavioral dispositions to engage in certain publicly observable behavior as a reaction to particular external stimuli. On this view, having a particular thought is the same as having a disposition to behave in a certain way. This view is often motivated by empirical considerations: it is very difficult to study thinking as a private mental process but it is much easier to study how organisms react to a certain situation with a given behavior. In this sense, the capacity to solve problems not through existing habits but through creative new approaches is particularly relevant. The term "behaviorism" is also sometimes used in a slightly different sense when applied to thinking to refer to a specific form of inner speech theory. This view focuses on the idea that the relevant inner speech is a derivative form of regular outward speech. This sense overlaps with how behaviorism is understood more commonly in philosophy of mind since these inner speech acts are not observed by the researcher but merely inferred from the subject's intelligent behavior. This remains true to the general behaviorist principle that behavioral evidence is required for any psychological hypothesis.

One problem for behaviorism is that the same entity often behaves differently despite being in the same situation as before. This problem consists in the fact that individual thoughts or mental states usually do not correspond to one particular behavior. So thinking that the pie is tasty does not automatically lead to eating the pie, since various other mental states may still inhibit this behavior, for example, the belief that it would be impolite to do so or that the pie is poisoned.

Computationalism
Computationalist theories of thinking, often found in the cognitive sciences, understand thinking as a form of information processing. These views developed with the rise of computers in the second part of the 20th century, when various theorists saw thinking in analogy to computer operations. On such views, the information may be encoded differently in the brain, but in principle, the same operations take place there as well, corresponding to the storage, transmission, and processing of information. But while this analogy has some intuitive attraction, theorists have struggled to give a more explicit explanation of what computation is. A further problem consists in explaining the sense in which thinking is a form of computing. The traditionally dominant view defines computation in terms of Turing machines, though 
contemporary accounts often focus on neural networks for their analogies. A Turing machine is capable of executing any algorithm based on a few very basic principles, such as reading a symbol from a cell, writing a symbol to a cell, and executing instructions based on the symbols read. This way it is possible to perform deductive reasoning following the inference rules of formal logic as well as simulating many other functions of the mind, such as language processing, decision making, and motor control. But computationalism does not only claim that thinking is in some sense similar to computation. Instead, it is claimed that thinking just is a form of computation or that the mind is a Turing machine.

Computationalist theories of thought are sometimes divided into functionalist and representationalist approaches. Functionalist approaches define mental states through their causal roles but allow both external and internal events in their causal network. Thought may be seen as a form of program that can be executed in the same way by many different systems, including humans, animals, and even robots. According to one such view, whether something is a thought only depends on its role "in producing further internal states and verbal outputs". Representationalism, on the other hand, focuses on the representational features of mental states and defines thoughts as sequences of intentional mental states. In this sense, computationalism is often combined with the language of thought hypothesis by interpreting these sequences as symbols whose order is governed by syntactic rules.

Various arguments have been raised against computationalism. In one sense, it seems trivial since almost any physical system can be described as executing computations and therefore as thinking. For example, it has been argued that the molecular movements in a regular wall can be understood as computing an algorithm since they are "isomorphic to the formal structure of the program" in question under the right interpretation. This would lead to the implausible conclusion that the wall is thinking. Another objection focuses on the idea that computationalism captures only some aspects of thought but is unable to account for other crucial aspects of human cognition.

Types of thinking
A great variety of types of thinking are discussed in the academic literature. A common approach divides them into those forms that aim at the creation of theoretical knowledge and those that aim at producing actions or correct decisions, but there is no universally accepted taxonomy summarizing all these types.

Entertaining, judging, and reasoning
Thinking is often identified with the act of judging. A judgment is a mental operation in which a proposition is evoked and then either affirmed or denied. It involves deciding what to believe and aims at determining whether the judged proposition is true or false. Various theories of judgment have been proposed. The traditionally dominant approach is the combination theory. It states that judgments consist in the combination of concepts. On this view, to judge that "all men are mortal" is to combine the concepts "man" and "mortal". The same concepts can be combined in different ways, corresponding to different forms of judgment, for example, as "some men are mortal" or "no man is mortal".

Other theories of judgment focus more on the relation between the judged proposition and reality. According to Franz Brentano, a judgment is either a belief or a disbelief in the existence of some entity. In this sense, there are only two fundamental forms of judgment: "A exists" and "A does not exist". When applied to the sentence "all men are mortal", the entity in question is "immortal men", of whom it is said that they do not exist. Important for Brentano is the distinction between the mere representation of the content of the judgment and the affirmation or the denial of the content. The mere representation of a proposition is often referred to as "entertaining a proposition". This is the case, for example, when one considers a proposition but has not yet made up one's mind about whether it is true or false. The term "thinking" can refer both to judging and to mere entertaining. This difference is often explicit in the way the thought is expressed: "thinking that" usually involves a judgment whereas "thinking about" refers to the neutral representation of a proposition without an accompanying belief. In this case, the proposition is merely entertained but not yet judged. Some forms of thinking may involve the representation of objects without any propositions, as when someone is thinking about their grandmother.

Reasoning is one of the most paradigmatic forms of thinking. It is the process of drawing conclusions from premises or evidence. Types of reasoning can be divided into deductive and non-deductive reasoning. Deductive reasoning is governed by certain rules of inference, which guarantee the truth of the conclusion if the premises are true. For example, given the premises "all men are mortal" and "Socrates is a man", it follows deductively that "Socrates is mortal". Non-deductive reasoning, also referred to as defeasible reasoning or non-monotonic reasoning, is still rationally compelling but the truth of the conclusion is not ensured by the truth of the premises. Induction is one form of non-deductive reasoning, for example, when one concludes that "the sun will rise tomorrow" based on one's experiences of all the previous days. Other forms of non-deductive reasoning include the inference to the best explanation and analogical reasoning.

Fallacies are faulty forms of thinking that go against the norms of correct reasoning. Formal fallacies concern faulty inferences found in deductive reasoning. Denying the antecedent is one type of formal fallacy, for example, "If Othello is a bachelor, then he is male. Othello is not a bachelor. Therefore, Othello is not male". Informal fallacies, on the other hand, apply to all types of reasoning. The source of their flaw is to be found in the content or the context of the argument. This is often caused by ambiguous or vague expressions in natural language, as in "Feathers are light. What is light cannot be dark. Therefore, feathers cannot be dark". An important aspect of fallacies is that they seem to be rationally compelling on the first look and thereby seduce people into accepting and committing them. Whether an act of reasoning constitutes a fallacy does not depend on whether the premises are true or false but on their relation to the conclusion and, in some cases, on the context.

Concept formation
Concepts are general notions that constitute the fundamental building blocks of thought. They are rules that govern how objects are sorted into different classes. A person can only think about a proposition if they possess the concepts involved in this proposition. For example, the proposition "wombats are animals" involves the concepts "wombat" and "animal". Someone who does not possess the concept "wombat" may still be able to read the sentence but cannot entertain the corresponding proposition. Concept formation is a form of thinking in which new concepts are acquired. It involves becoming familiar with the characteristic features shared by all instances of the corresponding type of entity and developing the ability to identify positive and negative cases. This process usually corresponds to learning the meaning of the word associated with the type in question. There are various theories concerning how concepts and concept possession are to be understood.

According to one popular view, concepts are to be understood in terms of abilities. On this view, two central aspects characterize concept possession: the ability to discriminate between positive and negative cases and the ability to draw inferences from this concept to related concepts. Concept formation corresponds to acquiring these abilities. It has been suggested that animals are also able to learn concepts to some extent, due to their ability to discriminate between different types of situations and to adjust their behavior accordingly.

Problem solving
In the case of problem solving, thinking aims at reaching a predefined goal by overcoming certain obstacles. This process often involves two different forms of thinking. On the one hand, divergent thinking aims at coming up with as many alternative solutions as possible. On the other hand, convergent thinking tries to narrow down the range of alternatives to the most promising candidates. Some researchers identify various steps in the process of problem solving. These steps include recognizing the problem, trying to understand its nature, identifying general criteria the solution should meet, deciding how these criteria should be prioritized, monitoring the progress, and evaluating the results.

An important distinction concerns the type of problem that is faced. For well-structured problems, it is easy to determine which steps need to be taken to solve them, but executing these steps may still be difficult. For ill-structured problems, on the other hand, it is not clear what steps need to be taken, i.e. there is no clear formula that would lead to success if followed correctly. In this case, the solution may sometimes come in a flash of insight in which the problem is suddenly seen in a new light. Another way to categorize different forms of problem solving is by distinguishing between algorithms and heuristics. An algorithm is a formal procedure in which each step is clearly defined. It guarantees success if applied correctly. The long multiplication usually taught in school is an example of an algorithm for solving the problem of multiplying big numbers. Heuristics, on the other hand, are informal procedures. They are rough rules-of-thumb that tend to bring the thinker closer to the solution but success is not guaranteed in every case even if followed correctly. Examples of heuristics are working forward and working backward. These approaches involve planning one step at a time, either starting at the beginning and moving forward or starting at the end and moving backward. So when planning a trip, one could plan the different stages of the trip from origin to destiny in the chronological order of how the trip will be realized, or in the reverse order.

Obstacles to problem solving can arise from the thinker's failure to take certain possibilities into account by fixating on one specific course of action. There are important differences between how novices and experts solve problems. For example, experts tend to allocate more time for conceptualizing the problem and work with more complex representations whereas novices tend to devote more time to executing putative solutions.

Deliberation and decision
Deliberation is an important form of practical thinking. It aims at formulating possible courses of action and assessing their value by considering the reasons for and against them. This involves foresight to anticipate what might happen. Based on this foresight, different courses of action can be formulated in order to influence what will happen. Decisions are an important part of deliberation. They are about comparing alternative courses of action and choosing the most favorable one. Decision theory is a formal model of how ideal rational agents would make decisions. It is based on the idea that they should always choose the alternative with the highest expected value. Each alternative can lead to various possible outcomes, each of which has a different value. The expected value of an alternative consists in the sum of the values of each outcome associated with it multiplied by the probability that this outcome occurs. According to decision theory, a decision is rational if the agent chooses the alternative associated with the highest expected value, as assessed from the agent's own perspective.

Various theorists emphasize the practical nature of thought, i.e. that thinking is usually guided by some kind of task it aims to solve. In this sense, thinking has been compared to trial-and-error seen in animal behavior when faced with a new problem. On this view, the important difference is that this process happens inwardly as a form of simulation. This process is often much more efficient since once the solution is found in thought, only the behavior corresponding to the found solution has to be outwardly carried out and not all the others.

Episodic memory and imagination
When thinking is understood in a wide sense, it includes both episodic memory and imagination. In episodic memory, events one experienced in the past are relived. It is a form of mental time travel in which the past experience is re-experienced. But this does not constitute an exact copy of the original experience since the episodic memory involves additional aspects and information not present in the original experience. This includes both a feeling of familiarity and chronological information about the past event in relation to the present. Memory aims at representing how things actually were in the past, in contrast to imagination, which presents objects without aiming to show how things actually are or were. Because of this missing link to actuality, more freedom is involved in most forms of imagination: its contents can be freely varied, changed, and recombined to create new arrangements never experienced before. Episodic memory and imagination have in common with other forms of thought that they can arise internally without any stimulation of the sensory organs. But they are still closer to sensation than more abstract forms of thought since they present sensory contents that could, at least in principle, also be perceived.

Unconscious thought
Conscious thought is the paradigmatic form of thinking and is often the focus of the corresponding research. But it has been argued that some forms of thought also happen on the unconscious level. Unconscious thought is thought that happens in the background without being experienced. It is therefore not observed directly. Instead, its existence is usually inferred by other means. For example, when someone is faced with an important decision or a difficult problem, they may not be able to solve it straight away. But then, at a later time, the solution may suddenly flash before them even though no conscious steps of thinking were taken towards this solution in the meantime. In such cases, the cognitive labor needed to arrive at a solution is often explained in terms of unconscious thoughts. The central idea is that a cognitive transition happened and we need to posit unconscious thoughts to be able to explain how it happened.

It has been argued that conscious and unconscious thoughts differ not just concerning their relation to experience but also concerning their capacities. According to unconscious thought theorists, for example, conscious thought excels at simple problems with few variables but is outperformed by unconscious thought when complex problems with many variables are involved. This is sometimes explained through the claim that the number of items one can consciously think about at the same time is rather limited whereas unconscious thought lacks such limitations. But other researchers have rejected the claim that unconscious thought is often superior to conscious thought. Other suggestions for the difference between the two forms of thinking include that conscious thought tends to follow formal logical laws while unconscious thought relies more on associative processing and that only conscious thinking is conceptually articulated and happens through the medium of language.

In various disciplines

Phenomenology
Phenomenology is the science of the structure and contents of experience. The term "cognitive phenomenology" refers to the experiential character of thinking or what it feels like to think. Some theorists claim that there is no distinctive cognitive phenomenology. On such a view, the experience of thinking is just one form of sensory experience. According to one version, thinking just involves hearing a voice internally. According to another, there is no experience of thinking apart from the indirect effects thinking has on sensory experience. A weaker version of such an approach allows that thinking may have a distinct phenomenology but contends that thinking still depends on sensory experience because it cannot occur on its own. On this view, sensory contents constitute the foundation from which thinking may arise.

An often-cited thought experiment in favor of the existence of a distinctive cognitive phenomenology involves two persons listening to a radio broadcast in French, one who understands French and the other who does not. The idea behind this example is that both listeners hear the same sounds and therefore have the same non-cognitive experience. In order to explain the difference, a distinctive cognitive phenomenology has to be posited: only the experience of the first person has this additional cognitive character since it is accompanied by a thought that corresponds to the meaning of what is said. Other arguments for the experience of thinking focus on the direct introspective access to thinking or on the thinker's knowledge of their own thoughts.

Phenomenologists are also concerned with the characteristic features of the experience of thinking. Making a judgment is one of the prototypical forms of cognitive phenomenology. It involves epistemic agency, in which a proposition is entertained, evidence for and against it is considered, and, based on this reasoning, the proposition is either affirmed or rejected. It is sometimes argued that the experience of truth is central to thinking, i.e. that thinking aims at representing how the world is. It shares this feature with perception but differs from it in the way how it represents the world: without the use of sensory contents.

One of the characteristic features often ascribed to thinking and judging is that they are predicative experiences, in contrast to the pre-predicative experience found in immediate perception. On such a view, various aspects of perceptual experience resemble judgments without being judgments in the strict sense. For example, the perceptual experience of the front of a house brings with it various expectations about aspects of the house not directly seen, like the size and shape of its other sides. This process is sometimes referred to as apperception. These expectations resemble judgments and can be wrong. This would be the case when it turns out upon walking around the "house" that it is no house at all but only a front facade of a house with nothing behind it. In this case, the perceptual expectations are frustrated and the perceiver is surprised. There is disagreement as to whether these pre-predicative aspects of regular perception should be understood as a form of cognitive phenomenology involving thinking. This issue is also important for understanding the relation between thought and language. The reason for this is that the pre-predicative expectations do not depend on language, which is sometimes taken as an example for non-linguistic thought. Various theorists have argued that pre-predicative experience is more basic or fundamental since predicative experience is in some sense built on top of it and therefore depends on it.

Another way how phenomenologists have tried to distinguish the experience of thinking from other types of experiences is in relation to empty intentions in contrast to intuitive intentions. In this context, "intention" means that some kind of object is experienced. In intuitive intentions, the object is presented through sensory contents. Empty intentions, on the other hand, present their object in a more abstract manner without the help of sensory contents. So when perceiving a sunset, it is presented through sensory contents. The same sunset can also be presented non-intuitively when merely thinking about it without the help of sensory contents. In these cases, the same properties are ascribed to objects. The difference between these modes of presentation concerns not what properties are ascribed to the presented object but how the object is presented. Because of this commonality, it is possible for representations belonging to different modes to overlap or to diverge. For example, when searching one's glasses one may think to oneself that one left them on the kitchen table. This empty intention of the glasses lying on the kitchen table are then intuitively fulfilled when one sees them lying there upon arriving in the kitchen. This way, a perception can confirm or refute a thought depending on whether the empty intuitions are later fulfilled or not.

Metaphysics
The mind–body problem concerns the explanation of the relationship that exists between minds, or mental processes, and bodily states or processes. The main aim of philosophers working in this area is to determine the nature of the mind and mental states/processes, and how—or even if—minds are affected by and can affect the body.

Human perceptual experiences depend on stimuli which arrive at one's various sensory organs from the external world and these stimuli cause changes in one's mental state, ultimately causing one to feel a sensation, which may be pleasant or unpleasant. Someone's desire for a slice of pizza, for example, will tend to cause that person to move his or her body in a specific manner and in a specific direction to obtain what he or she wants. The question, then, is how it can be possible for conscious experiences to arise out of a lump of gray matter endowed with nothing but electrochemical properties. A related problem is to explain how someone's propositional attitudes (e.g. beliefs and desires) can cause that individual's neurons to fire and his muscles to contract in exactly the correct manner. These comprise some of the puzzles that have confronted epistemologists and philosophers of mind from at least the time of René Descartes.

The above reflects a classical, functional description of how we work as cognitive, thinking systems. However the apparently irresolvable mind–body problem is said to be overcome, and bypassed, by the embodied cognition approach, with its roots in the work of Heidegger, Piaget, Vygotsky, Merleau-Ponty and the pragmatist John Dewey.

This approach states that the classical approach of separating the mind and analysing its processes is misguided: instead, we should see that the mind, actions of an embodied agent, and the environment it perceives and envisions, are all parts of a whole which determine each other. Therefore, functional analysis of the mind alone will always leave us with the mind–body problem which cannot be solved.

Psychology

Psychologists have concentrated on thinking as an intellectual exertion aimed at finding an answer to a question or the solution of a practical problem. Cognitive psychology is a branch of psychology that investigates internal mental processes such as problem solving, memory, and language; all of which are used in thinking. The school of thought arising from this approach is known as cognitivism, which is interested in how people mentally represent information processing. It had its foundations in the Gestalt psychology of Max Wertheimer, Wolfgang Köhler, and Kurt Koffka, and in the work of Jean Piaget, who provided a theory of stages/phases that describes children's cognitive development.

Cognitive psychologists use psychophysical and experimental approaches to understand, diagnose, and solve problems, concerning themselves with the mental processes which mediate between stimulus and response. They study various aspects of thinking, including the psychology of reasoning, and how people make decisions and choices, solve problems, as well as engage in creative discovery and imaginative thought. Cognitive theory contends that solutions to problems either take the form of algorithms: rules that are not necessarily understood but promise a solution, or of heuristics: rules that are understood but that do not always guarantee solutions. Cognitive science differs from cognitive psychology in that algorithms that are intended to simulate human behavior are implemented or implementable on a computer. In other instances, solutions may be found through insight, a sudden awareness of relationships.

In developmental psychology, Jean Piaget was a pioneer in the study of the development of thought from birth to maturity. In his theory of cognitive development, thought is based on actions on the environment. That is, Piaget suggests that the environment is understood through assimilations of objects in the available schemes of action and these accommodate to the objects to the extent that the available schemes fall short of the demands. As a result of this interplay between assimilation and accommodation, thought develops through a sequence of stages that differ qualitatively from each other in mode of representation and complexity of inference and understanding. That is, thought evolves from being based on perceptions and actions at the sensorimotor stage in the first two years of life to internal representations in early childhood. Subsequently, representations are gradually organized into logical structures which first operate on the concrete properties of the reality, in the stage of concrete operations, and then operate on abstract principles that organize concrete properties, in the stage of formal operations. In recent years, the Piagetian conception of thought was integrated with information processing conceptions. Thus, thought is considered as the result of mechanisms that are responsible for the representation and processing of information. In this conception, speed of processing, cognitive control, and working memory are the main functions underlying thought. In the neo-Piagetian theories of cognitive development, the development of thought is considered to come from increasing speed of processing, enhanced cognitive control, and increasing working memory.

Positive psychology emphasizes the positive aspects of human psychology as equally important as the focus on mood disorders and other negative symptoms. In Character Strengths and Virtues, Peterson and Seligman list a series of positive characteristics. One person is not expected to have every strength, nor are they meant to fully capsulate that characteristic entirely. The list encourages positive thought that builds on a person's strengths, rather than how to "fix" their "symptoms".

Psychoanalysis

The "id", "ego" and "super-ego" are the three parts of the "psychic apparatus" defined in Sigmund Freud's structural model of the psyche; they are the three theoretical constructs in terms of whose activity and interaction mental life is described. According to this model, the uncoordinated instinctual trends are encompassed by the "id", the organized realistic part of the psyche is the "ego", and the critical, moralizing function is the "super-ego".

For psychoanalysis, the unconscious does not include all that is not conscious, rather only what is actively repressed from conscious thought or what the person is averse to knowing consciously. In a sense this view places the self in relationship to their unconscious as an adversary, warring with itself to keep what is unconscious hidden. If a person feels pain, all he can think of is alleviating the pain. Any of his desires, to get rid of pain or enjoy something, command the mind what to do. For Freud, the unconscious was a repository for socially unacceptable ideas, wishes or desires, traumatic memories, and painful emotions put out of mind by the mechanism of psychological repression. However, the contents did not necessarily have to be solely negative. In the psychoanalytic view, the unconscious is a force that can only be recognized by its effects—it expresses itself in the symptom.

The collective unconscious, sometimes known as collective subconscious, is a term of analytical psychology, coined by Carl Jung. It is a part of the unconscious mind, shared by a society, a people, or all humanity, in an interconnected system that is the product of all common experiences and contains such concepts as science, religion, and morality. While Freud did not distinguish between "individual psychology" and "collective psychology", Jung distinguished the collective unconscious from the personal subconscious particular to each human being. The collective unconscious is also known as "a reservoir of the experiences of our species".

In the "Definitions" chapter of Jung's seminal work Psychological Types, under the definition of "collective" Jung references representations collectives, a term coined by Lucien Lévy-Bruhl in his 1910 book How Natives Think. Jung says this is what he describes as the collective unconscious. Freud, on the other hand, did not accept the idea of a collective unconscious.

Related concepts and theories

Laws of thought
Traditionally, the term "laws of thought" refers to three fundamental laws of logic: the law of contradiction, the law of excluded middle, and the principle of identity. These laws by themselves are not sufficient as axioms of logic but they can be seen as important precursors to the modern axiomatization of logic. The law of contradiction states that for any proposition, it is impossible that both it and its negation are true: . According to the law of excluded middle, for any proposition, either it or its opposite is true: . The principle of identity asserts that any object is identical to itself: . There are different conceptions of how the laws of thought are to be understood. The interpretations most relevant to thinking are to understand them as prescriptive laws of how one should think or as formal laws of propositions that are true only because of their form and independent of their content or context. Metaphysical interpretations, on the other hand, see them as expressing the nature of "being as such".

While there is a very wide acceptance of these three laws among logicians, they are not universally accepted. Aristotle, for example, held that there are some cases in which the law of excluded middle is false. This concerns primarily uncertain future events. On his view, it is currently "not ... either true or false that there will be a naval battle tomorrow". Modern intuitionist logic also rejects the law of excluded middle. This rejection is based on the idea that mathematical truth depends on verification through a proof. The law fails for cases where no such proof is possible, which exist in every sufficiently strong formal system, according to Gödel's incompleteness theorems. Dialetheists, on the other hand, reject the law of contradiction by holding that some propositions are both true and false. One motivation of this position is to avoid certain paradoxes in classical logic and set theory, like the liar's paradox and Russell's paradox. One of its problems is to find a formulation that circumvents the principle of explosion, i.e. that anything follows from a contradiction.

Some formulations of the laws of thought include a fourth law: the principle of sufficient reason. It states that everything has a sufficient reason, ground, or cause. It is closely connected to the idea that everything is intelligible or can be explained in reference to its sufficient reason. According to this idea, there should always be a full explanation, at least in principle, to questions like why the sky is blue or why World War II happened. One problem for including this principle among the laws of thought is that it is a metaphysical principle, unlike the other three laws, which pertain primarily to logic.

Counterfactual thinking
Counterfactual thinking involves mental representations of non-actual situations and events, i.e. of what is "contrary to the facts". It is usually conditional: it aims at assessing what would be the case if a certain condition had obtained. In this sense, it tries to answer "What if"-questions. For example, thinking after an accident that one would be dead if one had not used the seatbelt is a form of counterfactual thinking: it assumes, contrary to the facts, that one had not used the seatbelt and tries to assess the result of this state of affairs. In this sense, counterfactual thinking is normally counterfactual only to a small degree since just a few facts are changed, like concerning the seatbelt, while most other facts are kept in place, like that one was driving, one's gender, the laws of physics, etc. When understood in the widest sense, there are forms of counterfactual thinking that do not involve anything contrary to the facts at all. This is the case, for example, when one tries to anticipate what might happen in the future if an uncertain event occurs and this event actually occurs later and brings with it the anticipated consequences. In this wider sense, the term "subjunctive conditional" is sometimes used instead of "counterfactual conditional". But the paradigmatic cases of counterfactual thinking involve alternatives to past events.

Counterfactual thinking plays an important role since we evaluate the world around us not only by what actually happened but also by what could have happened. Humans have a greater tendency to engage in counterfactual thinking after something bad happened because of some kind of action the agent performed. In this sense, many regrets are associated with counterfactual thinking in which the agent contemplates how a better outcome could have been obtained if only they had acted differently. These cases are known as upward counterfactuals, in contrast to downward counterfactuals, in which the counterfactual scenario is worse than actuality. Upward counterfactual thinking is usually experienced as unpleasant, since it presents the actual circumstances in a bad light. This contrasts with the positive emotions associated with downward counterfactual thinking. But both forms are important since it is possible to learn from them and to adjust one's behavior accordingly to get better results in the future.

Thought experiments
Thought experiments involve thinking about imaginary situations, often with the aim of investigating the possible consequences of a change to the actual sequence of events. It is a controversial issue to what extend thought experiments should be understood as actual experiments. They are experiments in the sense that a certain situation is set up and one tries to learn from this situation by understanding what follows from it. They differ from regular experiments in that imagination is used to set up the situation and counterfactual reasoning is employed to evaluate what follows from it, instead of setting it up physically and observing the consequences through perception. Counterfactual thinking, therefore, plays a central role in thought experiments.

The Chinese room argument is a famous thought experiment proposed by John Searle. It involves a person sitting inside a closed-off room, tasked with responding to messages written in Chinese. This person does not know Chinese but has a giant rule book that specifies exactly how to reply to any possible message, similar to how a computer would react to messages. The core idea of this thought experiment is that neither the person nor the computer understands Chinese. This way, Searle aims to show that computers lack a mind capable of deeper forms of understanding despite acting intelligently.

Thought experiments are employed for various purposes, for example, for entertainment, education, or as arguments for or against theories. Most discussions focus on their use as arguments. This use is found in fields like philosophy, the natural sciences, and history. It is controversial since there is a lot of disagreement concerning the epistemic status of thought experiments, i.e. how reliable they are as evidence supporting or refuting a theory. Central to the rejection of this usage is the fact that they pretend to be a source of knowledge without the need to leave one's armchair in search of any new empirical data. Defenders of thought experiments usually contend that the intuitions underlying and guiding the thought experiments are, at least in some cases, reliable. But thought experiments can also fail if they are not properly supported by intuitions or if they go beyond what the intuitions support. In the latter sense, sometimes counter thought experiments are proposed that modify the original scenario in slight ways in order to show that initial intuitions cannot survive this change. Various taxonomies of thought experiments have been suggested. They can be distinguished, for example, by whether they are successful or not, by the discipline that uses them, by their role in a theory, or by whether they accept or modify the actual laws of physics.

Critical thinking
Critical thinking is a form of thinking that is reasonable, reflective, and focused on determining what to believe or how to act. It holds itself to various standards, like clarity and rationality. In this sense, it involves not just cognitive processes trying to solve the issue at hand but at the same time meta-cognitive processes ensuring that it lives up to its own standards. This includes assessing both that the reasoning itself is sound and that the evidence it rests on is reliable. This means that logic plays an important role in critical thinking. It concerns not just formal logic, but also informal logic, specifically to avoid various informal fallacies due to vague or ambiguous expressions in natural language. No generally accepted standard definition of "critical thinking" exists but there is significant overlap between the proposed definitions in their characterization of critical thinking as careful and goal-directed. According to some versions, only the thinker's own observations and experiments are accepted as evidence in critical thinking. Some restrict it to the formation of judgments but exclude action as its goal.

A concrete everyday example of critical thinking, due to John Dewey, involves observing foam bubbles moving in a direction that is contrary to one's initial expectations. The critical thinker tries to come up with various possible explanations of this behavior and then slightly modifies the original situation in order to determine which one is the right explanation. But not all forms of cognitively valuable processes involve critical thinking. Arriving at the correct solution to a problem by blindly following the steps of an algorithm does not qualify as critical thinking. The same is true if the solution is presented to the thinker in a sudden flash of insight and accepted straight away.

Critical thinking plays an important role in education: fostering the student's ability to think critically is often seen as an important educational goal. In this sense, it is important to convey not just a set of true beliefs to the student but also the ability to draw one's own conclusions and to question pre-existing beliefs. The abilities and dispositions learned this way may profit not just the individual but also society at large. Critics of the emphasis on critical thinking in education have argued that there is no universal form of correct thinking. Instead, they contend that different subject matters rely on different standards and education should focus on imparting these subject-specific skills instead of trying to teach universal methods of thinking. Other objections are based on the idea that critical thinking and the attitude underlying it involve various unjustified biases, like egocentrism, distanced objectivity, indifference, and an overemphasis of the theoretical in contrast to the practical.

Positive thinking
Positive thinking is an important topic in positive psychology. It involves focusing one's attention on the positive aspects of one's situation and thereby withdrawing one's attention from its negative sides. This is usually seen as a global outlook that applies especially to thinking but includes other mental processes, like feeling, as well. In this sense, it is closely related to optimism. It includes expecting positive things to happen in the future. This positive outlook makes it more likely for people to seek to attain new goals. It also increases the probability of continuing to strive towards pre-existing goals that seem difficult to reach instead of just giving up.

The effects of positive thinking are not yet thoroughly researched, but some studies suggest that there is a correlation between positive thinking and well-being. For example, students and pregnant women with a positive outlook tend to be better at dealing with stressful situations. This is sometimes explained by pointing out that stress is not inherent in stressful situations but depends on the agent's interpretation of the situation. Reduced stress may therefore be found in positive thinkers because they tend to see such situations in a more positive light. But the effects also include the practical domain in that positive thinkers tend to employ healthier coping strategies when faced with difficult situations. This effects, for example, the time needed to fully recover from surgeries and the tendency to resume physical exercise afterward.

But it has been argued that whether positive thinking actually leads to positive outcomes depends on various other factors. Without these factors, it may lead to negative results. For example, the tendency of optimists to keep striving in difficult situations can backfire if the course of events is outside the agent's control. Another danger associated with positive thinking is that it may remain only on the level of unrealistic fantasies and thereby fail to make a positive practical contribution to the agent's life. Pessimism, on the other hand, may have positive effects since it can mitigate disappointments by anticipating failures.

Positive thinking is a recurrent topic in the self-help literature. Here, often the claim is made that one can significantly improve one's life by trying to think positively, even if this means fostering beliefs that are contrary to evidence. Such claims and the effectiveness of the suggested methods are controversial and have been criticized due to their lack of scientific evidence. In the New Thought movement, positive thinking figures in the law of attraction, the pseudoscientific claim that positive thoughts can directly influence the external world by attracting positive outcomes.

See also

 Animal cognition
 Freethought
 Outline of human intelligence – topic tree presenting the traits, capacities, models, and research fields of human intelligence, and more
 Outline of thought – topic tree that identifies many types of thoughts, types of thinking, aspects of thought, related fields, and more
 Rethinking

References

Further reading

 Bayne, Tim (21 September 2013), "Thoughts", New Scientist. 7-page feature article on the topic.
 Fields, R. Douglas, "The Brain Learns in Unexpected Ways: Neuroscientists have discovered a set of unfamiliar cellular mechanisms for making fresh memories", Scientific American, vol. 322, no. 3 (March 2020), pp. 74–79. "Myelin, long considered inert insulation on axons, is now seen as making a contribution to learning by controlling the speed at which signals travel along neural wiring." (p. 79.)
 Rajvanshi, Anil K. (2010), Nature of Human Thought, .
 Simon, Herbert, Models of Thought, Vol I, 1979, ; Vol II, 1989, Yale University Press.

External links

 
 

 
Abstraction
Cognitive psychology
Cognitive science
Cognition
Concepts in metaphysics
Concepts in the philosophy of mind
Concepts in epistemology
Concepts in metaphilosophy
Consciousness studies
Creativity
Emergence
Empiricism
Free will
Idealism
Intelligence
Mental content
Mental processes
Metaphysics of mind
Mind–body problem
Neuropsychological assessment
Observation
Ontology
Perception
Qualia
Rationalism
Reasoning
Sensory systems
Sources of knowledge
Subjective experience
Theory of mind
Unsolved problems in neuroscience